Prunus is a genus of trees and shrubs, which includes (among many others) the fruits plums, cherries, peaches, nectarines, apricots, and almonds.

Native to the North American temperate regions, the neotropics of South America, and the paleotropics of Asia and Africa, 430 different species are classified under Prunus. Many members of the genus are widely cultivated for their fruit and for decorative purposes. Prunus fruit are drupes, or stone fruits. The fleshy mesocarp surrounding the endocarp is edible while the endocarp itself forms a hard, inedible shell called the pyrena ("stone" or "pit"). This shell encloses the seed (or "kernel") which is edible in many species (such as almonds) but poisonous in others (such as apricots). Besides being eaten off the hand, most Prunus fruit  are also commonly used in processing, such as jam production, canning, drying, and seeds for roasting.

Botany
Members of the genus can be deciduous or evergreen. A few species have spiny stems. The leaves are simple, alternate, usually lanceolate, unlobed, and often with nectaries on the leaf stalk along with stipules. The flowers are usually white to pink, sometimes red, with five petals and five sepals. Numerous stamens are present. Flowers are borne singly, or in umbels of two to six or sometimes more on racemes. The fruit is a fleshy drupe (a "prune") with a single relatively large, hard-coated seed (a "stone").

Within the rose family Rosaceae, it was traditionally placed as a subfamily, the Amygdaloideae (incorrectly "Prunoideae"), but was sometimes placed in its own family, the Prunaceae (or Amygdalaceae). More recently, Prunus is thought to have evolved from within a much larger clade now called subfamily Amygdaloideae (incorrectly "Spiraeoideae").

Classification

Evolutionary history 
The oldest fossils confirmed to belonging to Prunus date to the Eocene, which are found across the Northern Hemisphere, older potential Late Cretaceous records are unconfirmed.

Linnean classification
In 1737, Carl Linnaeus used four genera to include the species of modern Prunus—Amygdalus, Cerasus, Prunus, and Padus—but simplified it to Amygdalus and Prunus in 1758. Since then, the various genera of Linnaeus and others have become subgenera and sections, as all the species clearly are more closely related. Liberty Hyde Bailey says: "The numerous forms grade into each other so imperceptibly and inextricably that the genus cannot be readily broken up into species."

Traditional classification 
Historical treatments break the genus into several different genera, but this segregation is not currently widely recognised other than at the subgeneric rank. The ITIS recognises just the single genus Prunus, with an open list of species, all of which are given at List of Prunus species.

One treatment of the subgenera derives from the work of Alfred Rehder in 1940. Rehder hypothesized five subgenera: Amygdalus, Prunus, Cerasus, Padus, and Laurocerasus. To them C. Ingram added Lithocerasus. The six subgenera are described as follows:
 Subgenus Amygdalus, almonds and peaches: axillary buds in threes (vegetative bud central, two flower buds to sides); flowers in early spring, sessile or nearly so, not on leafed shoots; fruit with a groove along one side; stone deeply grooved; type species: Prunus dulcis (almond)
 Subgenus Prunus, plums and apricots: axillary buds solitary; flowers in early spring stalked, not on leafed shoots; fruit with a groove along one side, stone rough; type species: Prunus domestica (plum)
 Subgenus Cerasus, true cherries: axillary buds single; flowers in early spring in corymbs, long-stalked, not on leafed shoots; fruit not grooved, stone smooth; type species: Prunus cerasus (sour cherry)
 Subgenus Lithocerasus, bush cherries: axillary buds in threes; flowers in early spring in corymbs, long-stalked, not on leafed shoots; fruit not grooved, stone smooth; type species: Prunus pumila (sand cherry)
 Subgenus Padus, bird cherries: axillary buds single; flowers in late spring in racemes on leafy shoots, short-stalked; fruit not grooved, stone smooth; type species: Prunus padus (European bird cherry), now known to be polyphyletic
 Subgenus Laurocerasus, cherry laurels: mostly evergreen (all the other subgenera are deciduous); axillary buds single; flowers in early spring in racemes, not on leafed shoots, short-stalked; fruit not grooved, stone smooth; type species: Prunus laurocerasus (European cherry-laurel)

Phylogenetic classification 
An extensive phylogenetic study based on different chloroplast and nuclear sequences divides Prunus into three subgenera:
 Subg. Padus: In addition to species of Padus (bird cherries), this subgenus also includes species of Maddenia (false bird cherries), Laurocerasus (cherry laurels) and Pygeum.
 Subg. Cerasus: This subgenus includes true cherries such as sweet cherry, sour cherry, mahaleb cherry and Japanese flowering cherry.
 Subg. Prunus: This subgenus includes the following sections:
 Sect. Prunus: Old World plums
 Sect. Prunocerasus: New World plums
 Sect. Armeniaca: apricots
 Sect. Microcerasus: bush cherries
 Sect. Amygdalus: almonds
 Sect. Persica: peaches
 Sect. Emplectocladus: desert almonds

Species

The lists below are incomplete, but include most of the better-known species.

Eastern Hemisphere

 P. africana – African cherry
 P. apetala – clove cherry
 P. armeniaca – apricot
 P. avium – sweet cherry or wild cherry
 P. brigantina – Briançon apricot
 P. buergeriana – dog cherry
 P. campanulata – Taiwan cherry
 P. canescens – gray-leaf cherry
 P. cerasifera – cherry plum
 P. cerasoides – wild Himalayan cherry
 P. cerasus – sour cherry
 P. ceylanica
 P. cocomilia – Italian plum
 P. cornuta – Himalayan bird cherry
 P. davidiana – David's peach
 P. darvasica – Darvaz plum
 P. domestica – common plum
 P. dulcis – almond
 P. fruticosa – European dwarf cherry
 P. glandulosa – Chinese bush cherry
 P. grayana – Japanese bird cherry
 P. incana – willow-leaf cherry
 P. incisa – Fuji cherry
 P. jacquemontii – Afghan bush cherry
 P. japonica – Japanese bush cherry
 P. laurocerasus – cherry laurel
 P. lusitanica – Portugal laurel
 P. maackii – Manchurian cherry
 P. mahaleb – Mahaleb cherry
 P. mandshurica – Manchurian apricot
 P. maximowiczii – Korean cherry
 P. mume – Chinese plum
 P. nipponica – Japanese alpine cherry
 P. padus – bird cherry
 P. persica – peach
 P. pseudocerasus – Chinese sour cherry
 P. prostrata – mountain cherry
 P. salicina – Japanese plum
 P. sargentii – north Japanese hill cherry
 P. scoparia – mountain almond
 P. serrula – Tibetan cherry
 P. serrulata – Japanese cherry
 P. sibirica – Siberian apricot
 P. simonii – apricot plum
 P. speciosa – Oshima cherry
 P. spinosa – blackthorn, sloe
 P. ssiori – Hokkaido bird cherry
 P. subhirtella – winter-flowering cherry
 P. tenella – dwarf Russian almond
 P. tomentosa – Nanking cherry
 P. triloba – flowering plum
 P. turneriana – almondbark
 P. ursina – Bear's plum
 P. × yedoensis – Yoshino cherry
 P. zippeliana – big-leaf cherry (Chinese: 大叶桂樱)

Western Hemisphere

 P. alabamensis – Alabama cherry
 P. alleghaniensis – Allegheny plum
 P. americana – American plum
 P. andersonii – desert peach
 P. angustifolia – Chickasaw plum
 P. brasiliensis 
 P. buxifolia 
 P. caroliniana – Carolina laurelcherry
 P. cortapico
 P. emarginata – bitter cherry
 P. eremophila – Mojave Desert plum
 P. fasciculata – wild almond
 P. fremontii – desert apricot
 P. geniculata – scrub plum
 P. gentryi
 P. gracilis – Oklahoma plum
 P. havardii – Havard's plum
 P. hortulana – Hortulan plum
 P. huantensis
 P. ilicifolia – hollyleaf cherry
 P. integrifolia
 P. maritima – beach plum
 P. mexicana – Mexican plum
 P. minutiflora – Texas almond
 P. murrayana – Murray's plum
 P. myrtifolia – West Indies cherry
 P. nigra – Canada plum
 P. occidentalis – western cherry laurel
 P. pensylvanica –  pin cherry
 P. pleuradenia – Antilles cherry
 P. pumila – sand cherry
 P. rigida
 P. rivularis – creek plum
 P. serotina – black cherry
 P. subcordata – Klamath plum
 P. subcorymbosa
 P. texana – peachbush
 P. umbellata – flatwoods plum
 P. virginiana – chokecherry

Cultivation

The genus Prunus includes the almond, the nectarine and peach, several species of apricots, cherries, and plums, all of which have cultivars developed for commercial fruit and nut production. The almond is not a true nut; the edible part is the seed. Other species are occasionally cultivated or used for their seed and fruit.

A number of species, hybrids, and cultivars are grown as ornamental plants, usually for their profusion of flowers, sometimes for ornamental foliage and shape, and occasionally for their bark.

Because of their considerable value as both food and ornamental plants, many Prunus species have been introduced to parts of the world to which they are not native, some becoming naturalised.

The Tree of 40 Fruit has 40 varieties grafted on to one rootstock.

Species such as blackthorn (Prunus spinosa), are grown for hedging, game cover, and other utilitarian purposes.

The wood of some species (notably black cherry) is prized as a furniture and cabinetry timber, especially in North America.

Many species produce an aromatic gum from wounds in the trunk; this is sometimes used medicinally. Other minor uses include dye production.

Pygeum, a herbal remedy containing extracts from the bark of Prunus africana, is used as to alleviate some of the discomfort caused by inflammation in patients with benign prostatic hyperplasia.

Prunus species are food plants for the larvae of many Lepidoptera species (butterflies and moths); see List of Lepidoptera which feed on Prunus.

Prunus species are included in the Tasmanian Fire Service's list of low flammability plants, indicating that it is suitable for growing within a building protection zone.

Ornamental Prunus

Ornamentals include the group that may be collectively called "flowering cherries" (including sakura, the Japanese flowering cherries).

Toxicity
Many species are cyanogenic; that is, they contain compounds called cyanogenic glucosides, notably amygdalin, which, on hydrolysis, yield hydrogen cyanide. Although the fruits of some may be edible by humans and livestock (in addition to the ubiquitous fructivore of birds), seeds, leaves and other parts may be toxic, some highly so. The plants contain no more than trace amounts of hydrogen cyanide, but on decomposition after crushing and exposure to air or on digestion, poisonous amounts may be generated. The trace amounts may give a characteristic taste ("bitter almond") with increasing bitterness in larger quantities, less tolerable to people than to birds, which habitually feed on specific fruits.

Benefits to human health
People are often encouraged to consume many fruits because they are rich in a variety of nutrients and phytochemicals that are supposedly beneficial to human health. The fruits of Prunus often contain many phytochemicals and antioxidants. These compounds have properties that have been linked to preventing different diseases and disorders. Research suggests that the consumption of these fruits reduces the risk of developing diseases such as cardiovascular diseases, cancer, diabetes, and other age-related declines. Many factors can affect the levels of bioactive compounds in the different fruits of the genus Prunus, including the environment, season, processing methods, orchard operations, and postharvest management.

Cherries
Cherries contain many different phenolic compounds and anthocyanins, which are indicators of being rich in antioxidants. Recent research has linked the phenolic compounds of the sweet cherry (Prunus avium) with antitumor properties.

Reactive oxygen species (ROS) include superoxide radicals, hydrogen peroxide, hydroxyl radicals, and singlet oxygen; they are the byproducts of metabolism. High levels of ROS lead to oxidative stress, which causes damage to lipids, proteins, and nucleic acids. The oxidative damage results in cell death, which ultimately leads to numerous diseases and disorders. Antioxidants act as a defense mechanism against the oxidative stress. They are used to remove the free radicals in a living system that are generated as ROS. Some of those antioxidants include gutathione S-transferase, glutathione peroxidase, superoxide dismutase, and catalase. The antioxidants present in cherry extracts act as inhibitors of the free radicals. However, the DNA and proteins can be damaged when an imbalance occurs in the level of free radicals and the antioxidants. When not enough antioxidants are available to remove the free radicals, many diseases can occur, such as cancers, cardiovascular diseases, Parkinson's disease, etc. Recent studies have shown that using natural antioxidants as a supplement in chemotherapy can decrease the amount of oxidative damage. Some of these natural antioxidants include ascorbic acid, tocopherol, and epigallocatechin gallate; they can be found in certain cherry extracts.

Almonds
Similar to cherries, strawberries, and raspberries, almonds are also rich in phenolics. Almonds have a high oxygen radical absorbing capacity (ORAC), which is another indicator of being rich in antioxidants. As stated before, high levels of free radicals are harmful, thus having the capacity to absorb those radicals is greatly beneficial. The bioactive compounds, polyphenols and anthocyanins, found in berries and cherries are also present in almonds. Almonds also contain nonflavonoid and flavonoid compounds, which contribute to the antioxidant properties of almonds. Flavonoids are a group of structurally related compounds that are arranged in a specific manner and can be found in all vascular plants on land. They also contribute to the antioxidant properties of almonds. Some of the nonflavonoid compounds present are protocatechuic, vanillic, and p-hydroxybenzoic acids. Flavonoid compounds that can be found in the skin of the almond are flavanols, dihydroflavonols, and flavanones.

Plums
Of all of the different species of stone fruits, plums are the richest in antioxidants and phenolic compounds. The total antioxidant capacity (TAC) varies within each fruit, but in plums, TAC is much higher in the skin than in the flesh of the fruit.

Apricots
Apricots are high in carotenoids, which play a key role in light absorption during development. Carotenoids are the pigments that give the pulp and peel of apricots and other Prunus fruits their yellow and orange colors. Moreover, it is an essential precursor for vitamin A, which is especially important for vision and the immune system in humans. Moreover, these fruits are quite rich in phenolic substances, including catechin, epicatechin, p-coumaric acid, caffeic acid, and ferulic acid.

Peaches and nectarines
Similar to the plum, peaches and nectarines also have higher TAC in the skin than in the flesh. They also contain moderate levels of carotenoids and ascorbic acid. Peaches and nectarines are orange and yellow in color, which can be attributed to the carotenoids present.

Pests and diseases

Various Prunus species are winter hosts of the Damson-hop aphid, Phorodon humuli, which is destructive to hops Humulus lupulus just at the time of their maturity, so plum trees should not be grown in the vicinity of hop fields.

Corking is the drying or withering of fruit tissue. In stone fruit, it is often caused by a lack of boron and/or calcium.

Gummosis is a nonspecific condition of stone fruits (peach, nectarine, plum, and cherry) in which gum is exuded and deposited on the bark of trees. Gum is produced in response to any type of wound – insect, mechanical injury, or disease.

Apiosporina morbosa is a major fungal disease in the Northern Americas, with many urban centres running black knot fungus management programs. This disease is best managed by physical removal of knot-bearing branches to prevent spore spread and immediate disposal of infected tissue. Chemical treatment is not largely effective, as trees can easily be re-infected by neighbouring knots.

Palaeobotanical models

The earliest known fossil Prunus specimens are wood, drupe, seed, and a leaf from the middle Eocene of the Princeton Chert of British Columbia, Canada. Using the known age as calibration data, a partial phylogeny of some of the Rosaceae from a number of nucleotide sequences was reconstructed. Prunus and its sister clade Maloideae (apple subfamily) has been suggested to have diverged  which is within the Lutetian, or older middle Eocene. Stockey and Wehr report: "The Eocene was a time of rapid evolution and diversification in Angiosperm families such as the Rosaceae ...."

The Princeton finds are among a large number of angiosperm fossils from the Okanagan Highlands dating to the late early and middle Eocene. Crataegus is found at three locations: the McAbee Fossil Beds, British Columbia; the Klondike Mountain Formation around Republic, Washington, and the Allenby Formation around Princeton, British Columbia, while Prunus is found at those locations plus the Coldwater Beds of Quilchena, British Columbia and Chu Chua Formation around Chu Chua, British Columbia. A review of research on the Eocene Okanagan Highlands reported that the Rosaceae were more diverse at higher altitudes. The Okanagan highlands formations date to as early as 52 mya, but the 44.3 mya date, which is approximate, depending on assumptions, might still apply. The authors state: "... the McAbee flora records a diverse early middle Eocene angiosperm-dominated forest."

Etymology
The Online Etymology Dictionary presents the customary derivations of plum and prune from Latin prūnum, the plum fruit. The tree is prūnus; and Pliny uses prūnus silvestris to mean the blackthorn. The word is not native Latin, but is a loan from Greek προῦνον, which is a variant of προῦμνον, origin unknown. The tree is προύμνη. Most dictionaries follow Hoffman, Etymologisches Wörterbuch des Griechischen, in making some form of the word a loan from a pre-Greek language of Asia Minor, related to Phrygian.

The first use of Prunus as a genus name was by Carl Linnaeus in Hortus Cliffortianus of 1737, which went on to become Species Plantarum. In the latter, Linnaeus attributes the word to "Varr.", who it is assumed must be Marcus Terentius Varro.

Notes

References

External links

 
 
 Tree of 40 fruit website

 
Rosaceae genera
Fruit trees
Taxa named by Carl Linnaeus